Calothyrza pauli is a species of beetle in the family Cerambycidae. It was described by Léon Fairmaire in 1884. It is known from Somalia, Kenya, Ethiopia, and Tanzania.

References

Phrynetini
Beetles described in 1884